LaFayette William Argetsinger (February 24, 1858 – October 30, 1937) was an American farmer and politician from New York.

Life 
Argetsinger was born on February 24, 1858, in Rutland Township, Tioga County, Pennsylvania, the son of carpenter Peter Argetsinger and Clara Wood Updyke.

When Argetsinger was very young, he moved with his family to a large farm south of Geneva, New York, on Seneca Lake. A few years later, the family moved to Elmira, where he attended school. He worked as a trainman for the Northern Central Railroad.

In 1884, Argetsinger bought a fruit farm near Burdett. Although he had no farming experience at the time, he gradually expanded his land holdings and developed one of the larger fruit farms in the county.

In 1909, Argetsinger was elected to the New York State Assembly as a Republican, representing Schuyler County. He served in the Assembly in 1910. He also served as town supervisor for Hector, and was chairman of the Republican County Committee.

In 1883, Argetsinger married Eulalia Reynolds. Their children were J. Cameron and Lafayette W. Jr.

Argetsinger died in Shepard Hospital in Montour Falls on October 30, 1937. He was buried in Hector Union Cemetery in Burdett.

References

External links 

 The Political Graveyard
 LaFayette W. Argetsinger at Find a Grave

1858 births
1937 deaths
People from Tioga County, Pennsylvania
People from Geneva, New York
People from Elmira, New York
Farmers from New York (state)
People from Schuyler County, New York
20th-century American politicians
Republican Party members of the New York State Assembly
Town supervisors in New York (state)
Burials in New York (state)